The women's pole vault event at the 2007 Pan American Games was held on July 23.

Results

References
Official results

Pole
2007
2007 in women's athletics